Umberger is a German surname. Notable people with the surname include:

Andy Umberger (born  1957), American actor
Jerry Umberger (born 1942), American darts player
R. J. Umberger (born 1982), American ice hockey player

German-language surnames